Pablo Oscar Cavallero (born 13 April 1974) is an Argentine former footballer who played as a goalkeeper.

Nine years of his professional career were spent in Spain, mainly with Celta. He appeared in 152 La Liga matches over eight seasons.

An Argentine international for eight years, Cavallero played with his country in two World Cups and the 2004 Copa América.

Club career
Cavallero was born in Lomas de Zamora, Buenos Aires Province. During his professional career he played for Club Atlético Vélez Sarsfield, Unión de Santa Fe, RCD Espanyol, RC Celta de Vigo and Levante UD (the last three in Spain's La Liga). With the last club he also competed in the Segunda División, appearing in 38 games out of a possible 42 in the 2005–06 season as it returned to the top flight.

In his four-year spell with Celta, Cavallero won the Ricardo Zamora Trophy in 2002–03, as the Galicians eventually reached the UEFA Champions League. He allowed 27 goals in 34 matches, a goals-per-match average of 0.79.

After about one year out of professional football, Cavallero moved to Uruguay with Primera División side Peñarol, retiring in 2009 at the age of 35.

International career
Cavallero won 26 caps for Argentina in an eight-year span, and was a participant at the 1996 Summer Olympics, helping the national team win silver, and the 1998 and the 2002 FIFA World Cups (starting in the latter ahead of Roberto Bonano and Germán Burgos).

Honours
Vélez
Argentine Primera División: 1996 Clausura, 1998 Clausura
Supercopa Sudamericana: 1996
Recopa Sudamericana: 1997

Espanyol
Copa del Rey: 1999–2000

Celta
UEFA Intertoto Cup: 2000

Argentina
Summer Olympic Games: Silver medal 1996

Individual
Ricardo Zamora Trophy: 2002–03

References

External links

1974 births
Living people
People from Lomas de Zamora
Argentine sportspeople of Italian descent
Sportspeople from Buenos Aires Province
Argentine footballers
Association football goalkeepers
Argentine Primera División players
Club Atlético Vélez Sarsfield footballers
Unión de Santa Fe footballers
La Liga players
Segunda División players
RCD Espanyol footballers
RC Celta de Vigo players
Levante UD footballers
Uruguayan Primera División players
Peñarol players
Argentina international footballers
1998 FIFA World Cup players
2002 FIFA World Cup players
2004 Copa América players
Olympic footballers of Argentina
Footballers at the 1996 Summer Olympics
Olympic medalists in football
Olympic silver medalists for Argentina
Medalists at the 1996 Summer Olympics
Argentine expatriate footballers
Expatriate footballers in Spain
Expatriate footballers in Uruguay
Argentine expatriate sportspeople in Spain
Argentine expatriate sportspeople in Uruguay